Deborah Anne "Debbie" Sosimenko (born 5 April 1974 in Sydney) is a retired female hammer thrower from Australia, who represented her native country at two consecutive Summer Olympics, starting in 2000. She won a total number of eight national titles during the 1990s and early 2000s.

Achievements

References

 
 Profile
 

1974 births
Living people
Australian female hammer throwers
Athletes (track and field) at the 2000 Summer Olympics
Athletes (track and field) at the 2004 Summer Olympics
Olympic athletes of Australia
Sportswomen from New South Wales
Commonwealth Games gold medallists for Australia
Athletes (track and field) at the 1998 Commonwealth Games
Athletes from Sydney
Commonwealth Games medallists in athletics
Universiade medalists in athletics (track and field)
Universiade bronze medalists for Australia
Medalists at the 1997 Summer Universiade
Competitors at the 1998 Goodwill Games
Medallists at the 1998 Commonwealth Games